Pohamba Penomwenyo Shifeta (born 27 March 1968) is a Namibian politician. He is Namibia's  Minister of Environment and Tourism since his appointment by president Hage Geingob in March 2015.

Early life and education
Shifeta was born at Ongenga in the Ohangwena Region. He had been active in the SWAPO-led National Union of Namibian Workers and Namibia National Students Organisation since 1988. He earned a bachelor's degree in political science at the University of Namibia in 1996. He has also been involved in the SWAPO Party Youth League. Shifeta is an admitted full-time legal practitioner and completed a Bachelor of Laws (LLB) degree with the University of South Africa (Unisa).

Political career
Shifeta was first elected to the National Assembly of Namibia in 2004 as a SWAPO candidate. He was appointed as deputy Minister of Youth, National Service, Sport and Culture in March 2005, and he retained his position after the 2009 general election. In a December 2012 cabinet reshuffle, after the fifth SWAPO congress, Shifeta was moved to the post of deputy Minister of Environment and Tourism, working under Uahekua Herunga.

In president Hage Geingob's cabinet, appointed in March 2015, Shifeta was promoted to minister of Environment and Tourism.

References

1968 births
Living people
Members of the National Assembly (Namibia)
People from Ohangwena Region
University of Namibia alumni
University of South Africa alumni
SWAPO politicians
Environment and tourism ministers of Namibia